Olympos Kerkyra F.C. is a Greek football club, based in Corfu, Corfu (regional unit).

The club was founded in 1934. They will play in Football League 2 for the season 2013-14.

The Olympos FC Academy partnered with AEK Academy for the seasons 2014 - 2017.

Corfu (city)
Football clubs in the Ionian Islands (region)
Association football clubs established in 1934
1934 establishments in Greece